Helga Martin (real name Helga Dümler; 1940–1999) was a German film actress.

Life 
At the age of 16, she played in German movies for the first time. She impersonated "Frieda" in the movie My Aunt, Your Aunt. She became known at the side of Hans Albers in It Happened Only Once from the year 1958 and in the  When She Starts, Look Out beside Peter Alexander and Bibi Johns. One of her last appearances was in 1959 with Heinz Erhardt and Grethe Weiser in the comedy Der Haus-Tyrann and in Wolfgang Becker's . Will Tremper reported about her in the Stern series Deutschland deine Sternchen, whereupon the film producer  prematurely terminated a film contract with her.

Selected filmography 
 The Beautiful Master (1956)
 My Aunt, Your Aunt (1956)
  (1957)
 The Schimeck Family (1957)
 Love, Girls and Soldiers (1958)
 It Happened Only Once (1958)
 When She Starts, Look Out(1958)
  (1959)
 A Summer You Will Never Forget (1959)
 The Domestic Tyrant (1959)
  (1959)

References

External links 
 
 Helgaz Martin on FilmPortal.de

German film actresses
1940 births
1999 deaths